Diceman may refer to:

 The Dice Man, a 1971 book by George Cockcroft written under the pen name Luke Rhinehart
 Diceman (comics), a 1986 series of five game comics from the creators of 2000AD (and also a character in that series)
 The Diceman (TV series), an adventure travelogue on the Discovery Channel
 Andrew Dice Clay, American comedian and actor
 Richard D. James (Aphex Twin), British electronic musician
 Daisuke Matsuzaka (born 1980), Boston Red Sox pitcher
 Thom McGinty, Scottish-Irish street performer